The  is a commuter electric multiple unit (EMU) train type owned by the third-sector railway company Chiba New Town Railway and operated by the Hokuso Railway on the Hokuso Line in Japan since 1994. The trains are nicknamed "C-Flyer", with the "C" standing for Chiba.

Operations

The 9100 series trains are used on the following lines.
 Hokuso Line ( - )
 Keisei Main Line ( - )
 Keisei Oshiage Line ( - )
 Toei Asakusa Line ( - )
 Keikyu Main Line ( - )
 Keikyu Airport Line ( - )

Formation
As of 1 April 2013, the fleet consists of three eight-car sets, formed as shown below, with six motored (M) cars and two trailer (T) cars, and car 1 at the southern end.

The "M1" cars each have two pantographs, and the "M1'" car has one.

Interior
Passenger accommodation consists mostly of longitudinal bench seating, with some transverse seats at the car ends. The end cars each have a wheelchair space. The 1st-batch sets, 9101 and 9111, originally had public phones located in cars 3 and 6, but these were removed in 1997.

History

References

External links

 Hokuso Railway rolling stock details 
 Nippon Sharyo 9100 series details 

Electric multiple units of Japan
Train-related introductions in 1994
Nippon Sharyo multiple units
1500 V DC multiple units of Japan